Tripartite motif-containing protein 11 is a protein found in humans that is encoded by the TRIM11 gene.

The protein encoded by this gene is a member of the tripartite motif (TRIM) family. The TRIM motif includes three zinc-binding domains, a RING, a B-box type 1 and a B-box type 2, and a coiled-coil region. This protein localizes to the nucleus and the cytoplasm. Its function has not been identified.

References

Further reading